The oxalatonickelates are a class of compounds that contain nickel complexed by oxalate groups.  They form a series of double salts, and include clusters with multiple nickel atoms. Since oxalate functions as a bidentate ligand it can satisfy two coordinate positions around the nickel atom, or it can bridge two nickel atoms together.

The shape around the nickel atom is octahedral for diaquabis(oxalato)nickelate. The colour of this is green due to the Ni(–O–)6 chromophore. The absorption in infrared is at 8,300 9,060 13,400, 15,260, and 26,160 cm−1. The ligand field parameters are 10 Dq=8800 cm−1 and B=1000 cm−1.

Because the Ni2+ ion resembles many other divalent metal ions, it can be substituted by them, or substitute for them in other oxalate compounds to form mixed oxalates where the proportions can vary continuously. For example, magnesium nickel oxalate dihydrate.

References

Oxalato complexes
Nickel complexes